Surya Comedy is a Malayalam language pay television channel focused on comedy and broadcast in Malayalam on the Sun TV Network which is based in Thiruvananthapuram Kerala.

Programming 
Programmes broadcast on Surya Comedy have included a show with Saju Kodiyan, Jagathi vs. Jagathi with Jagathi Sreekumar, and phone-in shows.

External links 
 Official Website

References

Malayalam-language television channels
Sun Group
Television stations in Thiruvananthapuram
2017 establishments in Kerala
Television channels and stations established in 2017